Harold George Plummer was an English professional footballer who played as a full back.

References

Footballers from Bristol
English footballers
Association football defenders
Burnley F.C. players
Darlington F.C. players
English Football League players
Year of birth missing
Year of death missing